Lito Camo (born March 12, 1972) is a Filipino singer, songwriter and actor. He is known for his novelty songs including "Bakit Papa? Tawag mo ako?", "Spaghetti Song", "Bulaklak", "Wowowee", "Boom Tarat Tarat" and "Otso-Otso." Lito Camo is a native of Bongabong, Oriental Mindoro.

Career
His debut album entitled "Sino Camo?" was released in 1997 with "Kung Ikaw" and "Hey Babe" as the lead singles. Lito recently released his 3rd album entitled, Ako Naman. Camo was a mainstay in the GMA Channel sitcom Show Me Da Manny starring boxer Manny Pacquiao.

Discography

These are the songs composed, produced, and arranged by Lito Camo (most are sung by other Filipino artists, and not necessarily sung by him, except as indicated).

 "Bestfriend"
 "Kung Ikaw" by Lito Camo (his first hit single)
 "Window Shopping" by himself
 "Miss Na Miss Na Kita" by himself
 "Pera o Bayong" by himself
 "Kakanta Ako, Sasayaw Kayo" by himself
 "Bakit Papa" by the Sexbomb Girls
 "Halukay Ube" by the Sexbomb Girls featuring Joey de Leon
 "Eat Bulaga!" by the Sexbomb Girls
 "The Spageti Song" by Joey De Leon featuring the Sexbomb Girls
 "Sana Mama" by Masculados
 "Jumbo Hotdog" by Masculados
 "Ms. Flawless" by Angelica Jones
 "Ye Ye Vonnel" by April Boy Regino
 "Giling-Giling" by Willie Revillame
 "Bulaklak" by Viva Hot Babes
 "Anone?" by  Yachang
 "Pandesal" by Viva Hot Men
 "Sunod Sa Galaw" by Jaboom Twins
 "Puppy Mo Ako" by Willie Revillame
 "Iyugyog Mo" by Willie Revillame
 "Otso-Otso" by Bayani Agbayani
 "In or Out" by Dara
 "Sasakyan Kita" by K and the Boxers
 "46" by Willie Revillame
 "Hep Hep Hooray (Happy Birthday)" by Willie Revillame
 "Papa Boogie" by Willie Revillame
 "Wowowee" by himself, later covered by Willie Revillame
 "Dododo Dadada" by Willie Revillame
 "Giling-Giling" by Willie Revillame
 "Iiyak Na Lang" by Calzada
 "Boom Tarat Tarat" by Willie Revillame
 "Kailan" by 
 "Bilog Ang Mundo" by Manny Pacquiao
 "Uuwi Ka Na Raw" by 
 "Ibigay Mo Baby" by 
 "Daisy Siete" by himself, later covered by the Sexbomb Girls
 "Amoy Ng Papa" by 
 "Sundo't Hatid" by 
 "Nakaka..." by Masculados
 "Para Sa Iyo Ang Laban Na 'To" by Manny Pacquiao
 "Tawa" by Joey de Leon
 "Nanana" - won Best Novelty Recording in the 25th Awit Awards
 "Lalaban Ako Para sa Pilipino" by Manny Pacquiao
 "Talikodgenic Man Ako" by Herlene "Hipon" Budol

Albums

Sino Camo? (BMG Records, 1997)
Ano Camo? (BMG Records, 2002)
Ako Naman! (Star Records, 2005)

Filmography

Television

 Daisy Siete (GMA 7, 2003)
 Maynila (GMA 7, 2005–present) - cameo appearance
 Yes, Yes Show! (ABS-CBN 2, 2004–2005)
 Wowowee (ABS-CBN 2, 2005–2010)
 Show Me Da Manny (GMA 7, 2009–2011)
 Willing Willie (TV5, 2010–2011)
 Wiltime Bigtime (TV5, 2011–2012)
 Wowowillie (TV5, 2013)
 Sabado Badoo (GMA 7, 2015) - cameo footage featured
 Wowowin (GMA 7, 2015)

References

1972 births
21st-century Filipino male singers
20th-century Filipino male singers
People from Metro Manila
People from Oriental Mindoro
Tagalog people
Living people
Filipino television personalities
Filipino male pop singers
Filipino singer-songwriters
ABS-CBN personalities
GMA Network personalities
TV5 (Philippine TV network) personalities